Joseph P. Aucoin (born April 25, 1957) is a retired officer of the United States Navy and former commander of the United States Seventh Fleet.

Career
Vice Admiral Aucoin graduated from North Carolina State University with a Bachelor of Science in Electrical Engineering and received his commission through the University of North Carolina Naval Reserve Officers Training Corps program in 1980. He was designated a naval flight officer in 1981 and reported to Fighter Squadron 101 (VF-101) for initial training in the F-14 Tomcat.

He has served in five different Fleet and Fleet Replacement Squadron F-14 fighter squadrons, to include command of VF-41.  He is a graduate of the Navy Fighter Weapons School (TOPGUN) and has also commanded Carrier Air Wing Five (CVW-5), Carrier Strike Group Three (CSG-3), and was Deputy Chief of Naval Operations for Warfare Systems before taking command of U.S. 7th Fleet.

He is also an Arthur S. Moreau Scholar and holds master's degrees in Public Administration from Harvard University and in National Security Studies and Strategic Affairs from the Naval War College.

Speaking at West 2017 Conference in February 2017, Aucoin stated, "If there's a fight tonight, it's probably going to happen on the Korean Peninsula."  

Awards and decorations

References

1957 births
Living people
Harvard Kennedy School alumni
Naval War College alumni
North Carolina State University alumni
Place of birth missing (living people)
Recipients of the Distinguished Flying Cross (United States)
Recipients of the Legion of Merit
Recipients of the Navy Distinguished Service Medal
Recipients of the Silver Star
United States Naval Aviators
United States Navy vice admirals